A town is a type of incorporated urban municipality in the Canadian province of Saskatchewan. A resort village or a village can be incorporated as a town by the Minister of Municipal Affairs via section 52 of The Municipalities Act if:
Requested by the council of the resort village or village; and
the resort village or village has a population of 500 or more.

Saskatchewan has 146 towns that had a cumulative population of 137,725 and an average population of 943 in the 2011 Census. Saskatchewan's largest and smallest towns are Kindersley and Scott with populations of 4,678 and 75 respectively.

A city can be created from a town by the Minister of Municipal Affairs by ministerial order via section 39 of The Cities Act if the town has a population of 5,000 or more and the change in status is requested by the town council.

List

Gallery

See also
List of communities in Saskatchewan
List of municipalities in Saskatchewan

References 

Towns